Darreh Naqdi (also Romanized as Darreh Naqdī, Darreh Naqd, and Darreh-ye Naqdī) is a village in Darreh Seydi Rural District, in the Central District of Borujerd County, Lorestan Province, Iran. At the 2006 census, its population was 121, in 25 families.

References 

Towns and villages in Borujerd County